Juliet Nicole Simms (born February 26, 1986), also known as Lilith Czar, is an American musician, songwriter, and entrepreneur.

She established a fan base as the front woman of the band Automatic Loveletter. In 2007 - in the band's earliest years - she became friends with Kevin Lyman. This resulted in her being a returning act on the Warped Tour summer circuit. After the summer of 2011 and working the circuit solo for the first time, Juliet Simms has since produced her own content as a solo artist.

In 2011, Juliet Simms auditioned for Season 2 of NBC's The Voice. She sang 'Oh! Darling' by The Beatles for her blind audition, and chose CeeLo Green as her coach. She went on to cover songs such as 'Roxanne' by The Police and 'It's A Mans Mans Mans World' by James Brown. After placing second on The Voice, Simms signed with Universal Records, and then ultimately left the record label due to lack of creative control.

Juliet Simms went on to become an independent solo artist, releasing 3 EPs and plenty of singles and music videos, before signing with Sumerian Records in 2019.

On April 16, 2016, Juliet Simms married Black Veil Brides front man Andy Biersack.

In 2021, she rebranded, and now goes by the stage name of Lilith Czar. Lilith Czar released the album Created From Filth and Dust, under Sumerian Records in 2021.

Career

Automatic Loveletter 

Juliet Simms was the front woman and songwriter/guitarist for the band Automatic Loveletter from 2006 – 2011, releasing four EPs and two full - length albums before their disbandment in late 2011. Automatic Loveletter released its debut album, Truth or Dare, on June 22, 2010, followed by the album The Kids Will Take Their Monsters On through an independent record label, Paper & Plastick, on June 23, 2011.

Automatic Loveletter was formed with Juliet Simms on guitar and lead vocals, Daniel Currier on drums, and brother Tommy Simms playing bass and producing, with bassist Sean Noll sitting in on occasion in Tommy's home studio in the Tampa Bay area. The band was first called Stars and Scars and recorded its first song together in December 2005, naming the song after the band but written by Juliet Simms. They also recorded "Tin Lizzy", written by Tommy Simms.

Juliet Simms acoustically laid down all of the songs she had been writing over the last three years for consideration for her first major label album. Signed by Allison Hagendorf, the host of Fuse TV's The Pop TV Show, then working at Epic Records, Juliet Simms went on to form Automatic Loveletter while Epic struggled with the Sony BMG 2005 Payola Scandal and internal problems finally dropping over 70 bands in 2007. Automatic Loveletter was not dropped but was also not supported for the next year and a half touring in the drummer's Ford Excursion and burning their own copies of their Epic - produced CD with hand painted slip covers to help fund their tours.

Automatic Loveletter recorded their never - released debut EP in 2007 with producer Matt Squire (Panic! at the Disco, Boys Like Girls, All Time Low, Cute is What We Aim For, The Cab, and The Maine). "He challenged me and I challenged him," Juliet Simms said. "I felt very comfortable and that's when the best of me comes out. The entire time was playful and fun and that's what music is about to me — having a good time." Juliet Simms took her songbook to Matt Squire and narrowed down the tunes and crafted them to fit together, sometimes taking songs in entirely new directions. "The Answer", for instance, was originally a ballad, but became one of the more upbeat numbers on the album. Daniel Currier and lead guitarist Joe Nelson played on the album, Sean Noll officially joining just before some of their first tours together and Tommy Simms occasionally touring with the band to play lead or rhythm guitar in larger venues and outdoor concerts. The band played both the main Bamboozle and Bamboozle Left in 2008.

The tracks "The Answer", "Parker", "August 28Th 3:30 A.M.", "Hush" and "Make-up Smeared Eyes (Acoustic)" were released on their first official EP release in Recover 2007.

But after the tour, when Epic was scheduled to release the album Automatic Loveletter, they were told to continue touring and asked by then President Charlie Walk to write more upbeat music. Instead, Juliet Simms submitted a fan favorite "Black Ink Revenge" which was rejected several times for re - write until it became "My Goodbye" one of the tracks off the upcoming Sony release. "I had been signed to Epic for going on three years, I toured in cars with my completely broke band and was feeling like I disappointed my fans who had been promised music for over a year so I sat in my room for four days re - writing and re - submitting that song like 5 times. I like "My Goodbye" a LOT but it was the result of a lot of pressure and the desire to get an album released." "My Goodbye", "The Day that Saved Us", and "Hush (New Version)" were quickly released as another self - titled EP just before the final chapter with Epic Records when they fired all the members except Daniel Currier before the first headlining tour. Epic held auditions for new members, hired Jacob Fatoroochi, James Bowen, and Wayne Miller then halfway through the tour, called Juliet Simms and told her that all of the pay for the band she was on tour with was being withdrawn and the band was dropped. Despite this devastating setback, the new hired guys pulled together and stayed on to complete the tour, and Automatic Loveletter went on to sell out venues like the Knitting Factory in LA and San Francisco. "It was very liberating. After crying my eyes out for a couple hours, I had some of my best show's ever on that tour." Almost immediately, the band was picked up by Sony and Juliet Simms was asked to write for a new album produced by Josh Abraham.

Solo career 
In 2011, Juliet Simms released an entirely acoustic album through Paper + Plastick Records called "The Kids Will Take Their Monsters On". After the summer of  2011 and working the circuit entirely solo for the first time, Juliet Simms transitioned her branding after The Voice, and has since produced her own content as a solo artist releasing 2 EPs titled 'All Or Nothing' on January 27, 2015, and 'From The Grave' on July 15, 2016, as well as several singles.

In 2019, Juliet Simms announced her signing to Sumerian Records and released single "Bad Love" to kickoff the Rockstar Energy Disrupt 2019 Tour in August 2019. Following this, she released her second single with Sumerian, '100 Little Deaths' in September 2019.

In 2020, Juliet Simms released a 3-song EP titled 'Descent' along with a music video for the lead song off of the EP, 'All American'.

Announced on February 19, 2021, Juliet Simms has officially re - branded herself, now going as Lilith Czar, and her debut album with Sumerian Records 'Created From Filth And Dust' which released on April 23, 2021.

The Voice (2012) 
Juliet Simms was a contestant on the 2012 season of the American television show The Voice. She sang the Beatles' "Oh! Darling" for her blind audition, and chose to be a member of Team Cee Lo. Juliet Simms advanced to the live rounds after defeating Sarah Golden in a duet. In her first live show, she performed "Roxanne" by The Police. During the quarter - finals,  Juliet Simms covered "Cryin'" by Aerosmith. She was the only female contestant to advance onto the finals, edging out Jamar Rogers, after covering "It's A Man's Man's Man's World". Juliet Simms' cover of "It's A Man's Man's Man's World" reached #70 and also attained positions in three other charts on Billboard.

For the finale, Juliet Simms sang Lynyrd Skynyrd's "Free Bird" and placed second behind Jermaine Paul.

Juliet Simms' "The Voice Performances" singles released by Universal Republic Records. Made available on iTunes and CD

Post-The Voice (2012–present) 
Shortly after finishing The Voice, Juliet Simms was signed by CeeLo Green, her coach on the show. Her debut single "Wild Child" was released on December 11, 2012, followed by a music video in April 2013, for which Cee Lo Green is an executive producer. An album was scheduled for release in 2013, but ultimately was not released after she left. Juliet Simms completed a US tour with Secondhand Serenade and Veronica Ballestrini during March and April 2013.

On January 27, 2015, Juliet Simms released her "All or Nothing" EP. The recording and development of the album was primarily funded by PledgeMusic, A music video for the EP's fourth track, "End of the World", was released May 2015. Juliet Simms heavily promoted the EP during Warped Tour of that year.

Her second EP, From the Grave, was released July 15, 2016.

Most recently Juliet Simms was featured on the seventh installment in the Fearless Records compilation series Punk Goes Pop. She and her husband, Andy Biersack, performed a duet cover of Adele's 2015 hit song When We Were Young on July 14, 2017. A music video was also released for the cover upon the release of Punk Goes Pop Vol. 7. On April 27, 2018, she released her new single Take Me, which was written about the emotional hardships of two touring musicians in a committed relationship. The music video was released on May 9, 2018.

On June 21, 2019, Juliet Simms released her first single, ‘Bad Love’, through her new label Sumerian Records.

In February 2021, Juliet Simms announced her new name Lilith Czar, along with a new album called Created from Filth and Dust, set for release on April 23, 2021.

Lilith Czar

After leaving fans in the dust on social media after her 2020 EP 'Descent', Juliet Simms has posted teasers and photos but hiding her face. On February 19, 2021, she re - emerged now as Lilith Czar, with black hair and a crown upon her head. Also on February 19, 2021, she released the first single 'King', off her debut album with Sumerian Records titled 'Created From Filth And Dust' that is set to release on April 23, 2021.

Controversies

On October 31, 2016, Juliet Simms was detained by the FBI off of an airplane for allegedly hitting her husband, Andy Biersack while under the influence.

Juliet Simms herself has never spoken about the Church of Scientology.
"I'm sure she's known as a Scientologist by many in the Church," said Jeffrey Simms, noting he and his wife, Natalie Simms, who are Scientologists, moved to Clearwater, Florida with their family when Juliet Simms was 8 years old (Clearwater, Florida contains one of the  Church's many headquarters). "But [the support] isn't an organized thing. She probably has more fans from the Vans Warped Tour."

Discography

Music videos

Charts

References

External links 

 Juliet Simms 
Juliet Simms Official YouTube channel
Juliet Simms Official Instagram
Juliet Simms on Apple Music

Further reading 

 Includes a biography about Simms.
 Includes a biography about Simms.

Living people
Women punk rock singers
American women rock singers
American women singer-songwriters
Musicians from San Francisco
People from Clearwater, Florida
American soul singers
21st-century American singers
21st-century American women singers
Guitarists from California
21st-century American guitarists
21st-century American women guitarists
Singer-songwriters from California
1986 births
The Voice (franchise) contestants